Serena Tideman (born 24 February 1978) is an American composer and classical and improvisational cellist who resides in Port Townsend, 
Washington.

Career

Tideman's appearances include:

1999 – Played on Satisfact's CD "The Third Meeting At The Third Counter" alternative rock.
April 2001 – Played at SIL2K (Strategic Improv Laboratories) in a Cello Trio with Brent Arnold and Lori Goldston, Seattle.
October 2002 – Played for "White Girls", d9 Dance Collective's 10th Anniversary Performance Seattle, Music composed by Amy Denio, Velocity Dance MainSpace Theater.
November 2002 – Played with the Icelandic band múm, a two men and two women baroque-techno pop quartet.
September 2003 – Appears in Jason Pappariella's "places in pieces vol.1" in a segment titled "an alternative to shopping".
January 2004 – Played The Stranger: Classical cellist Serena Tideman matched with jangly post-punks
April 2004 – Played the space needle yuri's night world space party performance as member of plan b with musician/composer m.evans.
May 2007 – Played in New York City with Kría Brekkan – piano and voice
September 2007 – Performed solo cello compositions and improvisations at the Rendezvous Jewel Box Theatre, Seattle.

Works

Selected works include:

Secret Musik: The most recent release, 11 songs recorded live in a haunted Victorian built of old-growth wood, CD recorded in June 2009 and released July 31, 2010.
Kalakala: Songs From a Parallel Universe & Underwater Dreams (blue EP)
Underwater Dreams: An EP featuring piano, cello, vocals and guitar

References

External links
Tideman's MySpace page
Tideman performs Serendipity
Tideman performs An Alternative to Shopping

1978 births
American classical cellists
American women classical composers
American classical composers
Living people
Minimalist composers
21st-century American women musicians
21st-century cellists